Claude Brossette, seigneur de Varennes d'Appetour (7 November 1671, Theizé, Lyonnais - 1743) was a French lawyer and writer. He was educated at the Collège de la Trinité in Lyon and joined the Jesuits before turning to law.

In 1700 he founded  the Académie des Sciences, Arts et Belles-Lettres de Lyon, where he remained a bibliothecarian until 1743, and whose secretary he was appointed in 1724.

Brossette was a man of far-reaching connections, exchanging letters with Academy President Bouhier, Abbot Olivet and Father Vanière from Toulouse. Between 1699 and 1710 he was a regular correspondent of Paris poet and satirist  Boileau, whose works he edited with commentaries. Their correspondence was published in 1770 by François Louis Cizeron Rival. He was acquainted with François de Lamoignon and Bernard de La Monnoye from the Académie Française, and with Jean-Baptiste Rousseau. Later his reach widened; he exchanged point of views with Voltaire, Louis Racine, Abbot Lenglet-Dufresnoy, Déon, and Father Brumoy.

Works
Histoire Abrégée ou éloge historique de la ville de Lyon, 1711
Editions of Boileau, Molière

Notes and references
French article

External links
 

1671 births
1743 deaths
18th-century French male writers
French letter writers
18th-century French lawyers
French male non-fiction writers
18th-century letter writers